Who Are You, Mr. Sorge? is a 1961 French–Japanese drama film directed by Yves Ciampi. The original French-language name is Qui êtes-vous, Monsieur Sorge?

Plot
Since 1937, Richard Sorge was  his  in the German embassy in Tokyo. He was known as a doctor of sociology, who did not shun to become a front-line correspondent, as a pleasant, erudite interlocutor, in a word, as a  true Aryan.  They didn't know only one thing: behind his reporter's activities there was a secret mission, establishing contact with Moscow through a resident in Hong Kong.

Cast
 Thomas Holtzmann as Richard Sorge
 Mario Adorf as Max Clausen
 Akira Yamauchi as Hotsumi Ozaki
 Jacques Berthier as Serge Branovski
 Kōji Nanbara as Yotoku Miyagi
 Nadine Basile as Anna Clausen
 Keiko Kishi as Yuki Sakurai

Background
Since 1939, Sorge and Clausen had sent over 141 radio messages and numerous microfilms to Moscow. To his arrest on 18 October 1941, the observation of Japanese exile communists led by the Japanese secret police Tokko. In the course of which one of his contacts was exposed. On November 7, 1944, the anniversary of the October Revolution, Richard Sorge was hanged in Japan.

The German diplomat and writer Hans-Otto Meissner plays in the film itself.

References

External links
 
 Qui êtes-vous, Monsieur Sorge? on Unifrance

1960s French-language films
1960s Japanese-language films
Shochiku films
French historical drama films
Japanese historical drama films
1960s historical drama films
French spy drama films
1960s spy drama films
Spy films based on actual events
Japanese multilingual films
French multilingual films
1960s multilingual films
1961 drama films
1961 films
French black-and-white films
Japanese black-and-white films
1960s Japanese films
1960s French films